Aghaloughan is the name of several townlands in the island of Ireland. Its name derives from the Irish Achadh an Locháin, meaning "field of the lake".

Aghaloughan, a townland in County Antrim, Northern Ireland
A townland in County Cavan, Republic of Ireland
A townland in County Monaghan, Republic of Ireland
A townland in County Longford, Republic of Ireland